Eudlo is a rural town and locality in the Sunshine Coast Region, Queensland, Australia.

Geography 
Eudlo Creek rises in the south west of Eudlo. Also in the areas is Mossy Bank Mountain, a summit along an easterly protruding spur of the Blackall Range.

Eudlo railway station is on the North Coast railway line.

History

The name of Eudlo originated from the local Aboriginal term for the fresh water eel (Anguilla reinhardtii).

Cattlemen and timbergetters came to the area from the 1860s, but land was not made available for agricultural selection until the 1880s. The first selector was James Steele in 1887.

In 1891, the section of the North Coast railway line from Landsborough to Yandina was opened. It brought closer settlement to the whole district, and facilitated the transport of passengers, timber, fruit and produce.

Eudlo Post Office opened on 1 March 1891.

A sawmill was built at Eudlo and large quantities of timber from the Blackall Range, and surrounding forests, were either treated at the mill or railed to other centres. The timber industry was the means of livelihood for the early settlers. Eudlo was later settled in 1892 and still remains as an historic town.

Eudlo State School was opened on 6 September 1897.

On Saturday 11 August 1951, a stump-capping ceremony was held for the Eudlo Methodist Church. The church was built in 1952 by local builder Stan Carlsen. The church was officially opened on Saturday 16 August 1952. It was at 20-22 Anzac Avenue. It has closed and been converted to a house.

In 1974, the Chenrezig Institute was opened and remains one of the largest Tibetan Buddhist retreat in the Western world.

Education 
Eudlo State School is a government primary (Prep-6) school for boys and girls on the corner of Highlands Road and  Rosebed Street. In 2017, the school had an enrolment of 58 students with 10 teachers (4 full-time equivalent) and 7 non-teaching staff (3 full-time equivalent). In 2018, the school had an enrolment of 69 students with 9 teachers (5 full-time equivalent) and 11 non-teaching staff (4 full-time equivalent).

There are no secondary schools in Eudlo. The nearest government secondary schools are Nambour State College in Nambour to the north and Maleny State High School in Maleny to the south-west.

Amenities 
The Sunshine Coast Regional Council operates a mobile library service which visits the Community Hall at Rosebed Street.

Tourism
The area around Eudlo is situated in the green hills within the valley of the Blackall Ranges. The town centre close to the railway station features a memorial hall, general store and Sweethearts Cafe. West of Eudlo lies the Chenrezig Institute, the western world's largest Tibetan Buddhist retreat and meditation centre.

See also

References

External links

 
 Town map of Eudlo, 1974

Towns in Queensland
Suburbs of the Sunshine Coast Region
Localities in Queensland